Nerf is a toy brand formed by Parker Brothers and currently owned by Hasbro. Most of the toys are a variety of foam-based weaponry, with other Nerf products including balls for sports such as American football, basketball, and baseball. Their best known toys are their dart guns (referred to by Hasbro as "blasters") that shoot ammunition made from "Nerf foam" (partially reticulated polyether type polyurethane foam). Their primary slogan, first introduced in the 1990s, is "It's Nerf or Nothin'!".

History

Parker Brothers originally developed Nerf, beginning with a  polyurethane foam ball. In 1969, Reyn Guyer, a Minnesota-based games inventor, and Minnesota Vikings kicker Fred Cox came to the company with a football game that was safe for indoor play, and after studying it carefully, Parker Brothers decided to eliminate everything but the foam ball. In 1970, the Nerf ball was introduced as the "world's first official indoor ball", the name "Nerf" being a slang term for the foam padding used in off-roading. Marketing slogans promised that one can "Throw it indoors; you can't damage lamps or break windows. You can't hurt babies or old people." Some of the first TV commercials for the balls were joint promotions with General Foods' Kool-Aid drink mix, with Micky Dolenz, Davy Jones and Michael Nesmith of the Monkees playing with the balls on a living room soundstage (Kool-Aid sponsored the 1969–70 Saturday morning reruns of the Monkees' 1966–67 TV series). The ball filled a strong consumer need and by the year's end, more than four million Nerf balls had been sold. The  ball was followed by a large version called the "Super Nerf Ball". Shortly after, in 1972, a basketball game called "Nerfoop" and the Nerf football (developed by longtime NFL kicker Fred Cox) joined the family, with the latter quickly becoming Nerf's most popular ball.

The company continued to add to the Nerf line until they handed control to Kenner Products, a sister company.  In 1987, Kenner was bought by the Tonka Corporation, which itself was purchased by Hasbro in 1991, which then became the owner of Nerf. Throughout the 1990s and early 2000s, the Nerf brand served under the subsidiaries OddzOn and Larami before Hasbro took full control of the brand.

Over the years, Nerf has continued to expand the line, adding new looks to existing products, with later lines of Nerf products ranging from sport balls and foam dart blasters to video games and accessories.

In February 2013, Hasbro announced the release of its "Rebelle" line, a sub-line aimed at girls, with its first products released in fall of 2013.

In November 2013, POW! Books published The Ultimate Nerf Blaster Book. Written by Nathaniel Marunas, the book highlights the history of Nerf and provides details on every N-Strike, Dart Tag, and Vortex blaster produced at the time of the book's release.

In 2015, the Rival line of blasters was first released. The first products released were the Rival Apollo XV-700 and the Rival Zeus MXV-1200. These blasters fire a new type of ammunition, known as "High Impact Rounds", which are small foam balls that can reach a higher velocity than foam darts. The Rival line is targeted towards an older audience, with each product listing the age of 14+ on the box. 

In 2021, the Hyper line of blasters was announced. Initial products included the Hyper Rush-40, Hyper Siege-50, and Hyper Mach-100. Hyper rounds are similar in design to Rival rounds, but are smaller and made of a thermoplastic elastomer material that is more rubber-like than the foam used in Rival rounds.

Products

Nerf Blasters

Nerf's most popular product type are Nerf blasters, which are toy plastic guns that shoot foam darts. These darts have different-style tips, including Velcro-tipped in order to stick to Nerf vests (typically shipped with Dart Tag blasters), suction cup darts designed to stick to smooth surfaces, streamlined darts to fit into magazines (referred to as clips by Nerf), some able to whistle in flight, Darts may also have different colors, such as colors that reflect certain sub-lines, camouflage, and glow in the dark. Most Nerf blasters also have rails, known as tactical rails, which can accommodate different attachments, as well as special adapters such barrel and stock adapters. The "N-strike" sub-line was launched in 2004, and is styled more like a real weapon than previous Nerf products. It was updated in 2012 as N-Strike Elite.

Rebelle 
Rebelle was predominantly aimed at the female demographic, with similar internal mechanics to the Nerf N-Strike elite line, sporting pink, purple and teal colors.

Zombie Strike
The Zombie Strike line was launched in 2013, and is geared for fans of Humans vs. Zombies games. All blasters have a distinct zombie apocalypse theme, with newer blasters featuring a DIY aesthetic.

Rival
Nerf Rival blasters (branded as RIVAL) fire small foam balls referred to by Nerf as "High Impact Rounds", but usually referred to as “Rival Balls” or "Rival Rounds" by the Nerf community. Nerf Rival blasters are targeted towards an older target market than Nerf's better-known dart blasters.

Nitro
In 2017, Hasbro released the Nerf Nitro line, which consists of blasters that fire foam cars into obstacles and stunt ramps.

Ultra
Released in September 2019, Nerf Ultra (branded as ULTRA) blasters fire a new, propriety dart design that is marketed as "THE FARTHEST FLYING DART EVER. Darts can travel up to 120 feet."  The new Ultra darts are constructed from a lightweight foam that is notably different from traditional darts in that they are made with closed-cell, rather than open-cell foam.  This construction allows for fins to be molded into the rear of the darts.  Size-wise, Ultra darts are between N-Strike Elite darts and Mega darts in diameter, but shorter than both in length.  They cannot be fired from any previous Nerf line or off-brand compatible blasters, nor can any other lines' darts be fired from Ultra blasters. This design was created in response to the growing number of third-party darts, including exact knockoffs from China, available for N-Strike Elite blasters at a much lower cost than Nerf-brand darts.

Super Soaker

Originally owned and marketed by Larami, Super Soaker is a popular line of water guns. Recently, Hasbro has released a line of Nerf-branded Super Soaker blasters.

Lazer Tag

Lazer Tag, a popular laser tag toy line from the mid-1980s, is also currently part of the Nerf banner. The current generation of Lazer Tag blasters attach to iPhones or iPod Touch units for enhanced playability.

Nerf Dog
In June 2013, Hasbro and Grammercy Products unveiled Nerf Dog, a line of Nerf-inspired canine retrieving toys made of rubber, nylon, and plastic. Nerf Dog was launched at Walmart stores, and debuted at pet specialty stores in Fall 2013.

Based in Secaucus, N.J., Gramercy Products, Inc. is the manufacturer of Nerf Dog products.

The Nerf Dog Tennis Ball Blaster mimics traditional Nerf blaster designs and shoots a ball up to 50 feet in the air. The toy uses special softer balls to reduce the risk of injury.

Video games
Nerf has also produced video game accessories for the PlayStation 2, Nintendo DSi, DS Lite, 3DS and the Wii. Visionary Media, Inc. released the first-person shooter Nerf Arena Blast (or NAB, sometimes Arena Blast) in 1999. EA Games, in association with Hasbro, released the 2008 video game Nerf N-Strike and its 2009 sequel Nerf N-Strike Elite. Both games feature the Switch Shot EX-3, which doubles as a functional dart blaster and a Wii Remote accessory. In June 2019, Raw Thrills released the Nerf Arcade game.
GameMill Entertainment published Nerf Legends, a first-person shooter game released on 19 November 2021 for Microsoft Windows, Nintendo Switch, PlayStation 4, PlayStation 5, Xbox One and Xbox Series X/S. In 2021, an online multiplayer first-person shooter titled Nerf Strike was developed by The Gang Stockholm and released by Metaverse Team under license from Hasbro on the online platform Roblox. In August 2022, developers Secret Location under licence from Hasbro released the Virtual reality game multiplayer shooter titled NERF Ultimate Championships for the Meta Quest 2 platform.

Awards
In 2011, the Nerf N-Strike Stampede ECS was awarded "Boy Toy of the Year" and the Nerf Super Soaker Shot Blast won "Outdoor Toy of the Year" at the 11th Annual Toy of the Year Awards, which is held at the American International Toy Fair in New York City.

In 2014, the Nerf Zombie Strike Crossfire Bow won the award for "Best Action Toy" at the 2014 U.K. Toy Fair.

Legal issues
In June 2010, Hasbro sued Buzz Bee Toys and Lanard Toys for patent violation of its Nerf and Super Soaker brands. The lawsuit stated that Buzz Bee and Lanard infringed two U.S. patents for the Nerf N-Strike Disc Shot blaster, while Buzz Bee infringed on a Super Soaker patent. In November of that year, Hasbro won its patent case against Buzz Bee with the latter banned from producing certain water guns.

In April 2012, Hasbro contacted the Australia-based fan blog "Urban Taggers" for leaking information on unreleased Nerf products found on the Chinese marketplace website Taobao. Hasbro allegedly tricked one of the bloggers into disclosing his home address for their lawyers to mail him a cease and desist letter. The incident resulted in fans setting up a campaign on Facebook boycotting Hasbro.

See also
 Nerf war
 Nerf (video gaming), term referencing the Nerf brand of toys

References

External links
 
 

1960s toys
Products introduced in 1969
1970s toys
1980s toys
1990s toys
2000s toys
2010s toys
Hasbro franchises
Hasbro products
Toy weapons